Lithostege griseata, the grey carpet, is a moth of the family Geometridae. The species was first described by Michael Denis and Ignaz Schiffermüller in 1775. It is found in most of Europe, from Great Britain and the Iberian Peninsula to the Ural Mountains and further east to central Asia and Transcaucasia, Asia Minor and the Near East.

The wingspan is 28–31 mm. Adults are on wing from May to July.

The larvae feed on the developing seeds of Descurainia sophia and Erysimum cheiranthoides. They are green with a pale line along the side.

Subspecies
Lithostege griseata griseata (Denis & Schiffermüller, 1775)
Lithostege griseata cycnaria Guenée, 1858

References

External links

Grey carpet at UKMoths
Hants Moths
Bold Systems Taxonomy Browser
Lepiforum e.V.
Schmetterlinge-Deutschlands.de

Chesiadini
Moths of Europe
Moths of Asia
Taxa named by Michael Denis
Taxa named by Ignaz Schiffermüller
Moths described in 1775